Retinitis pigmentosa 9 (autosomal dominant), also known as RP9 or PAP-1, is a protein which in humans is encoded by the RP9 gene.

Function 

The removal of introns from nuclear pre-mRNAs occurs on a complex called a spliceosome, which is made up of 4 small nuclear ribonucleoprotein (snRNP) particles and an undefined number of transiently associated splicing factors. The exact role of PAP-1 in splicing is not fully understood, but it is thought that PAP-1 localizes in nuclear speckles containing the splicing factor SC35 and interacts directly with another splicing factor, U2AF35.

Clinical significance 

Mutations in PAP1 underlie autosomal dominant retinitis pigmentosa mapped to the RP9 gene locus.

Interactions
RP9 has been shown to interact with U2 small nuclear RNA auxiliary factor 1.

References

Further reading